Ted McCord, A.S.C.  (August 2, 1900 – January 19, 1976) was an American cinematographer.

Biography
Born in Sullivan County, Indiana, McCord received three Academy Award nominations. The first two Johnny Belinda (1948) and  Two for the Seesaw (1962) were for black-and white cinematography, and the third The Sound of Music (1965) was for color.

McCord died of cancer in Glendale, California at the age of 75. He is interred at Glendale's Forest Lawn Memorial Park.

Selected filmography

 Man From 1997 (1956 television anthology episode)

Oscar nominations
1966: Best Cinematography, Color for The Sound of Music
1963: Best Cinematography, Black-and-White for Two for the Seesaw
1948: Best Cinematography, Black-and-White for Johnny Belinda

References

External links

Ted McCord at the American Film Institute Catalog

1900 births
1976 deaths
People from Sullivan County, Indiana
American cinematographers
Deaths from cancer in California
Burials at Forest Lawn Memorial Park (Glendale)